Cargile is a surname. Notable people with the surname include:

Steve Cargile (born 1982), American football player
Winona Cargile Alexander (1893–1984), African-American academic

See also
Cargill (surname)